2,5-dimethoxy-4-bromophenylpiperazine (2C-B-PP) is a drug of the phenylpiperazine class. It acts as an agonist at serotonin receptors, and in studies on rats substituted for the psychedelic amphetamine derivative DOM with around 1/10 the potency but similar rates of stimulus-appropriate responding at the highest dose.

See also 
 2C-B-aminorex
 2C-B-BZP
 3-Chloro-4-fluorophenylpiperazine
 CPD-1
 ORG-12962
 Quipazine
 Substituted piperazine

References 

Bromoarenes
Phenylpiperazines